Miss America 1969, the 42nd Miss America pageant, was held at the Boardwalk Hall in Atlantic City, New Jersey on September 7, 1968 on NBC Network. Miss Illinois was the winner, Judith Ford performing on a trampoline during the talent competition of the pageant. She later became a physical education teacher at an elementary school.

The event was the site of a protest held on the boardwalk sponsored by feminists. They threw feminine products, like bras, pots, false eyelashes, mops, and other items into a "Freedom trash can". The event was reported under the headline "Bra Burners and Miss America," which conflated the idea of the protest with men who burned their draft cards.

Results

Placements

Order of announcements

Top 10

Top 5

Awards

Preliminary awards

Other awards

Protest 

A protest held outside Boardwalk Hall was attended by about 200 feminists. The protest, nicknamed No More Miss America!, was organized by New York Radical Women, included tossing feminine products, bras, pots, false eyelashes, mops, and other items into a "Freedom trash can" on the Atlantic City boardwalk.   

A story by Lindsy Van Gelder in the New York Post carried the headline "Bra Burners and Miss America."  Her story drew an analogy between the feminist protest and Vietnam War protesters who burned their draft cards. The bra-burning trope was erroneously and permanently attached to the event and became a catch-phrase of the feminist era.

A lesser known protest was also organized on the same day by civil rights activist J. Morriss Anderson. It was held at the Ritz Carlton Hotel a few blocks from the Miss America pageant. They crowned the first Miss Black America.

Contestants

References

1969
1968 in the United States
1969 beauty pageants
1968 in New Jersey
September 1968 events in the United States
Events in Atlantic City, New Jersey
Women in New Jersey
Women in Illinois